Tropidophis pardalis, also known commonly as  the leopard dwarf boa and the spotted brown trope, is a species of snake in the family Tropidophiidae. The species is endemic to Cuba.

References

Tropidophiidae
Reptiles of Cuba
Endemic fauna of Cuba
Reptiles described in 1840
Snakes of the Caribbean